Ilya Alexeyevich Samsonov (born 22 February 1997) is a Russian professional ice hockey goaltender for the Toronto Maple Leafs of the National Hockey League (NHL).

Growing up in Magnitogorsk, Russia, Samsonov made his Kontinental Hockey League (KHL) debut playing in relief with Metallurg Magnitogorsk during the 2014–15 KHL season. After a successful junior season with Metallurg's Junior club, Stalnye Lisy, Samsonov was ranked as the top European Goalie in the 2015 NHL Entry Draft. He was eventually drafted 22nd overall by the Washington Capitals despite missing the scouting combine in Buffalo and conducting no interviews with the team. Following the 2015 Draft, Samsonov returned to the KHL where he posted a 6–4–3 record with a 2.04 goals-against average and .925 save percentage through 19 games.

Following the 2017–18 KHL season, Samsonov embarked on his NHL career by signing a three-year, entry-level contract with the Washington Capitals. Samsonov participated in the Capitals training camp but was re-assigned to their American Hockey League (AHL) affiliate, the Hershey Bears, prior to the start of the 2018–19 season. He eventually made his NHL debut the following season while playing in a primary backup role to starter Braden Holtby. Following his debut win, Samsonov subsequently won 10 more to become only the third NHL rookie goalie to win his first eleven contests and the first since 1973–74.

Early life
Samsonov was born on 22 February 1997, in Magnitogorsk, Russia to mother Natalya. Samsonov became a fan of ice hockey due to the influence of his grandfather, and chose the position of goaltender because he liked the look of the equipment.

Playing career

Metallurg Magnitogorsk
Growing up in Russia, Samsonov began playing junior hockey with the Stalnye Lisy for the 2014–15 season. While playing with the Lisy, Samsonov posted an 11-4-1 record, 2.66 goals-against average, and a .918 save percentage. As a result of his junior play, Samsonov made his Kontinental Hockey League (KHL) debut playing in relief with Metallurg Magnitogorsk on 11 December 2014, against HC Sibir Novosibirsk. Samsonov was ranked as the top European Goalie eligible for the 2015 NHL Entry Draft and drew comparisons to Andrei Vasilevskiy. He subsequently became the first goaltender drafted in the first round since 2012 and only the third in franchise history when he was drafted 22nd overall. Samsonov was chosen in the first round despite missing the scouting combine in Buffalo and conducting no interviews with the Capitals.

Following the draft, Samsonov returned to the Metallurg Magnitogorsk for the 2015–16 season where he posted a 6-4-3 record with a 2.04 goals-against average and .925 save percentage through 19 games. He played a backup role during the 2016 Gagarin Cup playoffs but made six appearances and posted a 2–2–0 record with a 2.29 GAA and a .916 save percentage. Samsonov subsequently helped the Magnitogorsk win the 2016 Gagarin Cup. Once the season concluded, Samsonov attended the Capitals 2016 Development Camp and adjusted to North American ice. Due to the language barrier, Capitals senior director of communications Sergey Kocharov was on the ice when Samsonov was conducting drills during their Development Camp.

After spending time with the Capitals, Samsonov returned to Magnitogorsk for the 2016–17 KHL season. He began the season strong by posting a 6-0-0 record and earned a .919 save percentage and 2.26 goals-against average through 10 games played. Samsonov concluded the season posting a 15-3-5 record, a save percentage of .936, and a goals-against average of 2.13 through 27 games. In his final KHL season, Samsonov began by posting a 6–5–1 record with a 2.77 goals-against-average and a .912 save percentage by November 2017. However, he then suffered a concussion during a 3–1 loss to the HC Lada Togliatti after he entered the game in relief of starter Vasily Koshechkin. Samsonov finished the 2017–18 KHL season with a 12–9–1 record, a save percentage of .926, and a goals-against average of 2.31 through 26 games. He was the chosen starter for Game 1 of the 2017 Gagarin Cup playoffs and he saved 26 of the 28 shots to lead the team to a win.

Washington Capitals
Following the 2017–18 season, Samsonov embarked on his NHL career by signing a three-year, entry-level contract with the Washington Capitals on 4 May 2018. After the signing, the Capitals traded Philipp Grubauer to the Colorado Avalanche leaving a backup goaltending spot available which Samsonov was expected to eventually fill. Off the ice, he hired an English tutor to assist with the language barrier and worked on adjusting to North American rink sizes. In September, Samsonov participated in the Capitals training camp but was re-assigned to their American Hockey League (AHL) affiliate, the Hershey Bears, prior to the start of the 2018–19 season. Upon joining the Bears, Samsonov and the team struggled in their first five games. They recorded no points through five games and Samsonov suffered a lower-body injury that took him nearly a week to recover. He eventually earned his first AHL win on 1 November in a shootout over the Wilkes-Barre/Scranton Penguins by stopping 19 of 22 shots. He posted a 3-5-0 record with a 3.73 goals against average before being called up to serve as backup for Pheonix Copley. He did not make his NHL debut during the call up and was re-assigned to the AHL on 19 November.

Once Samsonov was returned to the Bears, he continued to struggle and was replaced by Vítek Vaněček who tallied a 17–10–5 record through 32 games. However, Samsonov began to improve during the second half of the season and recorded two shutouts. One of the items he worked on was changing his form from playing on his knees to standing taller in net, the Capitals’ preferred positioning. Between 12 January and 27 February, Samsonov recorded three shutouts and posted a 10–0–1 record. By April, Samsonov posted a record of 19–14–5 with a 2.74 goals against average and a .896 save percentage in 36 games.

Samsonov made the opening night roster for the 2019–20 season as Holtby's new backup and he made his NHL debut in a start against the New York Islanders on 4 October 2019. Samsonov made 25 saves in the 2–1 Capitals win, including 17 over the final two periods. Following his debut win, Samsonov subsequently won 10 more to become only the third NHL rookie goalie to win his first eleven contests and the first since 1973–74. Following his win over the Ottawa Senators on 31 January 2020, Samsonov yielded a 16–2–1 record, 2.11 goals-against average, and a .925 save percentage. As a result of his play over this time period, Samsonov led all rookie goaltenders with 15 wins and was projected to replace Holtby who could become an unrestricted free agent. However, following this achievement, Samsonov's playing time decreased once he went 0-4-1 in his last six games before the NHL was paused due to the COVID-19 pandemic. At the time of the pause, Samsonov ranked second among rookie goaltenders in wins behind Mackenzie Blackwood and ranked 15th overall in even-strength save percentage (.923) among the goaltenders who have played at least 25 games. After a four month pause, The Capitals returned to the ice to prepare for the 2020 Stanley Cup playoffs. However, Samsonov was unable to play for the Capitals during their playoff berth as a result of an injury he suffered during the pause in play. 

After Holtby wasn't retained, Samsonov became Washington's starter with Henrik Lundqvist serving as a veteran backup for the 2020–21 season. Lundqvist was originally expected to share the net with Samsonov but a heart condition caused him to step away from hockey. Once Lundqvist decided not to return to the Capitals, Samsonov became the Capitals full starter from the beginning of the season. In his first game as Washington's starting netminder, Samsonov stopped 22 of 26 shots to beat the Buffalo Sabres 6–4. However, his success was shortlived as he was placed in quarantine on 21 January and the team was fined $100,000 for player violations of League COVID-19 protocols. Samsonov was removed from COVID protocol on 8 February but spent time with the Hershey Bears on a conditioning stint for an extra 20 days. By May, Samsonov had accumulated a 13-4-1 record with a 2.69 GAA through 19 games before he was scratched for disciplinary reasons on 3 May. Following the healthy scratch, Samsonov was placed in NHL COVID-19 protocols a second time.

Between injuries and being in and out of coronavirus protocol, Samsonov missed some time, including the first two games of the 2021 Stanley Cup playoffs against the Boston Bruins. Samsonov returned for Game 3 but misplayed the puck during double overtime and turned it over to Craig Smith, who took advantage and scored the game-winning goal, giving the Bruins a 2–1 series lead. The following game, he made 22 saves in the first two periods before Boston scored four goals to win 4–1. The Capitals never recovered and were ultimately eliminated by the Bruins in five games.

Prior to the 2021–22 season, the Washington Capital re-signed Samsonov to a one-year $2 million contract. He began the season strong by recording a 9–1–1 record with a 2.52 goals against average and three shutouts by mid-November. He also did not record a loss in regulation until 30 November in a 5–4 loss to the Florida Panthers. On 6 April 2022, Samsonov made his fourth start in 15 games and stopped 25 of 28 shots by the Tampa Bay Lightning to mark his first 20-win season in the NHL.

Toronto Maple Leafs
As a free agent from the Capitals, Samsonov opted to sign a one-year, $1.8 million contract for the  season with the Toronto Maple Leafs on 13 July 2022. Samsonov was hired in anticipation that he would be the secondary part of a tandem with Matt Murray, but after Murray was injured two games into the 2022–23 season, Samsonov was elevated to the team's starting goaltender for at least the next four weeks.

International play
As a native of Russia, Samsonov has represented his home country on the junior level at numerous international tournaments. He made his international debut during the 2014 World U-17 Hockey Challenge where he helped the Russia men's national under-18 ice hockey team win a bronze medal. The following year, Samsonov represented Russia at the 2015 IIHF World U18 Championships where they placed 5th overall and failed to medal. Despite this, he was recognized as the tournaments top goaltender. Samsonov later earned his first World Junior silver medal during the 2016 World Junior Ice Hockey Championships. In his final year of junior eligibility, Samsonov represented Russia at the 2017 World Junior Ice Hockey Championships. After Russia fell to Team USA following a Troy Terry hat-trick, the junior team won a bronze medal with a win over Sweden.

Personal life
In 2019, Samsonov married his longtime girlfriend Maria Semyonova in Magnitogorsk, Russia.

Career statistics

Regular season and playoffs

International

Awards and honors

References

External links

1997 births
Living people
Hershey Bears players
Metallurg Magnitogorsk players
National Hockey League first-round draft picks
People from Magnitogorsk
Russian ice hockey goaltenders
Sportspeople from Chelyabinsk Oblast
Stalnye Lisy players
Toronto Maple Leafs players
Washington Capitals draft picks
Washington Capitals players